Gislemyr  is a neighbourhood in the city of Kristiansand in Agder county, Norway. It is located in the borough of Vågsbygd and in the district of Slettheia. Gislemyr is north of Karuss, and south of Trane, and west of Blørstad and Fiskåtangen.

Transportation

References

Geography of Kristiansand
Neighbourhoods of Kristiansand